Fetch Softworks is the developer of the Mac FTP client, Fetch. The first version of Fetch was
created in 1989 by Fetch Softworks founder, Jim Matthews, when he was an employee of Dartmouth College. After participating on Who Wants to be a Millionaire in December 2000, Jim Matthews used his winnings to purchase Fetch’s source code and name from Dartmouth College to start Fetch Softworks. Fetch Softworks has three full-time developers and is located in Etna, New Hampshire.

References

External links 
 

Software companies based in New Hampshire
Software companies of the United States